Sandra del Castillo (born 26 August 1959) is a Mexican equestrian. She competed in two events at the 1984 Summer Olympics.

References

1959 births
Living people
Mexican female equestrians
Olympic equestrians of Mexico
Equestrians at the 1984 Summer Olympics
Place of birth missing (living people)